Stephan Tschudi-Madsen (25 August 1923 - 11 October 2007) was a Norwegian art historian. Tschudi-Madsen was the first antiquarian at the Norwegian Directorate for Cultural Heritage from 1959 until 1978 and was Director-general  between 1978–1991. He was the  Advisory President of the International Council on Monuments and Sites (ICOMOS) from 1981-1990  and ICOMOS Norway President 1978-1992.

Early life
Tschudi-Madsen was born in Bergen, Norway.
He graduated in 1950 from the University of Oslo with a thesis in art history on Romantic architecture. In 1952-1953 he worked as a British Council scholar in London. Tschudi-Madsen received his Ph.D. in 1956.

Career
Tschudi-Madsen worked as an antiquarian at the Directorate for Cultural Heritage in Norway from 1959. He was active for the preservation of Norwegian wooden buildings during the European Architectural Heritage Year campaign that was organized in 1975. He was also one of the pioneers of rediscovering the qualities of the compact Art Nouveau townscape of Ålesund, Norway. He was engaged in international cultural heritage through the association ICOMOS where he held a central position, and through UNESCOs work with World Heritage Sites. Under his leadership Urnes stave church and Bryggen in Bergen were listed in 1979. For a period he was also vice president of the UNESCO World Heritage Committee.

Tschudi-Madsen had a large academic production. He was adviser for the restoration of the Royal Palace, Oslo, Supreme Court of Norway and Den Nationale Scene in Bergen. For a long period he was the president of Friends of Akershus Fortress. He was a supporter for establishing an Art Nouveau Interpretation centre, Jugendstilsenteret in Ålesund, Norway. Between 1999-2003 he also worked as adviser for Jugendstilsenteret.

Honors
Tschudi-Madsen was member of the Norwegian Academy of Science and Letters (1965) and Honorary Member of the Society for the Preservation of Ancient Norwegian Monuments (1983) and Honorary Member of ICOMOS (1992). He was Knight, First Class, of the Royal Norwegian Order of St. Olav (1983), Commander of the Dutch Order of Oranje-Nassau (1986), Knight of the Belgian Order of Leopold II (1992) and Commander of the Royal Norwegian Order of St. Olav (1996).

Selected bibliography
 The Art Nouveau style, 2002 
 The British ambassador's residence in Oslo 2001 
 Norway and Conservation Aspect. Vern og Virke 1983, Oslo 1984
 Principles in Practice. Reflecting on Conservation of Wooden Architecture. ICOMOS Information, Napoli, Paris 1984
 Henrik Bull cop.1983
 Restoration and anti-restoration. (2. ed.) Oslo 1981
 Introduction. Luce Hinsch: ICOMOS 1965-1980. Oslo 1980
 Ansprache des Norwegischen Reichantiquars Stephan Tschudi-Madsen. Verleihung des Europa-Preises und der Europa-Goldmedaille für Denkmalpflege, Hamburg 1979
 Akershus Schloss. Le Château d'Akershus. Oslo 1977
 Sources of Art Nouveau, New York 1976
 Restoration and anti-restoration. A Study in English Restoration Philosophy, Oslo 1976 (2. ed. 1981)
 Art Nouveau - byen Ålesund. Arkitektens drøm igår - hans dilemma idag, Byggekunst nr. 114-15 Oslo 1975
 Beite, Kåre, Jugendstilen 1974
 "Neo-Art Nouveau and psychedelic art". Bulletin du 22. Congés International d'Histoire l'Art, 1969. Budapest 1972
 Hauglid, Roar – Report to the Council of Europe on Action relating to the Preservation and Rehabilitation of immovable cultural property, 1970
 Art Nouveau, Tokyo 1970
 El simbolismo del Art Nouveau. Cuadernos summanueva vision, Buenes Aires 1969
 Horta. Los trabajos y el estilo de Victor Horta antes 1900. Cusadernos summanueva vision, Buenes Aires 1969
 Art Nouveau. Cauder nos summanueva, Buenes Aires 1969
 "Akershus Castle. Unconquered Fortress", The Norseman 1968
 Il simbolismo dell'Art Nouveau. Edilizia Moderna, Milano 1965
 The works of Alexis de Chateauneuf in London and Oslo 1965
 "Rosendal. Norwegian Manor House with Scottish Connections". The Connoisseur, February 1960
 Morris and Munthe "Federico Barocci's "Noli me tangere" and two cartoons". The Burlington Magazine, Vol. CI 1959
 An introduction to Edvard Munch's wall paintings in the Oslo University, Aula 1959
 Sources of Art Nouveau, Oslo 1956. N.Y. 1957 (2. ed. N.Y. 1975)
 Horta. Works and Style before 1900, 1955
 "Some recently discovered Drawings by Rubens. The Burlington Magazine, Vol. XCV, September 1953
 Victoriansk dekorativ kunst 1837–1901, 1952
 Romantikkens arkitektur, 1949

References

Other sources
 Bjerkek, Ole Petter : Stephan Tschudi-Madsen. Biografi, tillitsverv og bibliografi, Oslo 2007
 Lunde, Øivind (et al.) : Honnør til en hånet stil'' - Festskrift til Stephan Tschudi-Madsen på 70-årsdagen. Aschehoug forlag, Oslo 1999

External links
ICOMOS Norge website

1923 births
2007 deaths
Writers from Bergen
Norwegian architectural historians
Directors of government agencies of Norway
Norwegian antiquarians
Art Nouveau
University of Oslo alumni
Members of the Norwegian Academy of Science and Letters
Commanders of the Order of Orange-Nassau
Knights of the Order of Leopold II
Order of Saint Olav
20th-century antiquarians